James Stanley McCarty (born 25 July 1943) is an English musician, best known as the drummer for the Yardbirds and Renaissance. Following Chris Dreja's departure from the Yardbirds in 2013, McCarty became the only member of the band to still tour in the band. He was inducted into the Rock and Roll Hall of Fame in 1992 as a member of the Yardbirds.

Early life
He was born at Walton Hospital in Liverpool, England, but his family moved to London when he was two years old. He attended Hampton School in Hampton where Paul Samwell-Smith was a fellow pupil. When playing with the early Yardbirds, he worked as a stockbroker in the London Stock Exchange.

Career
McCarty has performed and recorded with the Yardbirds, Together, Renaissance, Shoot, Illusion, the Yardbirds reunion band Box of Frogs, Stairway, the British Invasion All-Stars, and Pilgrim, as well as under his own name and as the Jim McCarty Band. Since 1992 he has been playing with the reformed Yardbirds.

McCarty’s drumming influenced others to play styles other than early rock 'n' roll, and he is especially recognized for his early career innovations.

McCarty  has released two solo albums; Out of the Dark (1994), and Sitting on the Top of Time (2009)

Band timeline

References

Bibliography
 Yardbirds (John Platt, Chris Dreja, Jim McCarty) Sidgwick & Jackson, 1983. 
 Yardbirds : The Ultimate Rave-Up (Greg Russo) Crossfire Publications, 1997. 
 The Yardbirds (Alan Clayson) Backbeat Books, 2002. 
 Nobody Told Me: My Life with the Yardbirds, Renaissance and Other Stories (Jim McCarty with Dave Thompson), 2018.

External links
 
 Jim McCarty's website
 Extensive interview with Jim McCarty

1943 births
Living people
People educated at Hampton School
English rock drummers
British male drummers
English autobiographers
The Yardbirds members
Musicians from Liverpool
British rhythm and blues boom musicians
Renaissance (band) members
Box of Frogs members